Letheringham is a sparsely populated civil parish in the East Suffolk district (formerly Deben Rural District and then Suffolk Coastal) in Suffolk, England, on the Deben River. 

St Mary is a tiny church, the remains of the tower and nave of a Priory church, and sits in a farmyard. It is open 24 hours a day. 

For over 1000 years Letheringham has been a parish of ancient Loes Hundred, a unit of government never technically abolished whose functions were transferred in the late 19th century to various modern divisions of government. 

From the 2011 Census population details were no longer maintained for this parish and were included in the civil parish of Hoo.

Personalities
 Robert Naunton (1563–1635), English politician and writer : location of death
 Sir Robert Wingfield of Letheringham (1403–1454), a son of a senior Sir Robert Wingfield (c. 1370 – 3 May 1409) and Elizabeth Russell
 Captain Edward Maria Wingfield (1550–1631), a soldier, Member of Parliament, (1593) and English colonist in America
 Akenfield, a 1976 film  was partly shot on location in Letheringham.

References

External links
 Photographs of Letheringham on flickr.com

Villages in Suffolk
Civil parishes in Suffolk